The Chudova is a river in Perm Krai, Russia, a left tributary of Kolva which in turn is a tributary of Vishera. It flows into the Kolva  from Kolva's mouth, near the town of Cherdyn.

References 

Rivers of Perm Krai